Antinephele efulani is a moth of the family Sphingidae. It was described by Benjamin Preston Clark in 1926 and is known from the Democratic Republic of the Congo, Gabon and Cameroon.

The costal margin of the forewing upperside is apically shaded with green. There is a mid-brown semi-lunar patch on the outer margin bordered basally by a series of four irregularly sagittate (arrowhead-shaped) bluish-white markings.

References

Antinephele
Moths described in 1926
Insects of Cameroon
Fauna of Gabon
Moths of Africa